Katanobacteria is a bacterial phylum formerly known as WWE3. It has candidate status, meaning there are no cultured representatives, and is a member of the Candidate Phyla Radiation (CPR).

The Katanobacteria phylum was first proposed in 2008 following the analysis of 16S rRNA gene sequences from a mesophilic anaerobic digester. The name "Katanobacteria" comes from the Hebrew word "katan", which translates to "small". This is presumably a nod to the small cell size and/or genome size of members of this phylum (and most members of the CPR).

References 

Candidatus taxa
Bacteria phyla